Girl Friday is a 1994 BBC reality television special, starring Joanna Lumley in which she spends ten days on the desert island of Tsarabanjina near Madagascar. Lumley wrote an accompanying book, also called Girl Friday, which was published by BBC Books.

The title is based on the idiom derived from Friday, a character in Robinson Crusoe.

Tsarabanjina
The programme was filmed on the Malagasy island of Tsarabanjina, off the northwest coast of Madagascar. Uninhabited at the time of broadcast, the island has since been partially developed into a luxury resort.

References

External links

 BBC Genome, archive of the original TV listing
 BBC Programme website
 Marriott, Edward, "What a Difference a Hotel Makes", Evening Standard, 25 May 2001

BBC television documentaries
1990s British reality television series
1994 British television series debuts
1994 British television series endings